Spilled Water is a children's novel by Sally Grindley, published in 2004. It won the Nestlé Children's Book Prize Gold Award and was longlisted for the Carnegie Medal. It tells the story of a Chinese girl, Lu Si-yan, who is sold into domestic service when she is just eleven years old. The story also tells of Lu Si-Yan working as an underaged worker in a factory sweat shop.

Plot summary
The story is told in three parts : early childhood, life as a domestic servant and  life working in a factory. It is told through the eyes of Lu Si-Yan, an eleven-year-old girl.

Her early childhood is described as a rural idyll. She has a doting father who makes a living growing vegetables on a very small strip of land. A baby brother is born, whom Si-yan loves. But then her father is killed in a road accident and Si-yan's mother, overwhelmed by grief, cannot keep the family going when faced with one disaster after another. Disapproving Uncle Ba takes Lu Si-yan to market to sell her, calling her "Spilled Water" : a waste because she is not a boy.

She joins the Chen household as an unpaid domestic servant. She is well fed and well clothed but worked very hard and is constantly criticised by Mrs Chen. The only positive things are, Xiong Fei, a student employed as a cook, who is a fun loving young man; and Mr Chen's mother Mrs Hong, who uses a wheelchair. Lu Si-Yan is frightened by the Chen's son Yi-mou, whom she is told she must marry. He acts strangely because he is brain damaged. Mrs Hong finds out what the Chen's are up to, gives Lu Si-Yan money and helps her to escape.

Lu Si-yan goes to catch the boat up river, but discovers she had been robbed. A couple, Mr and Mrs Wang, offer to pay her boat fare and to give her a job in their factory. The factory makes toys. The employees work under harsh conditions. They are never paid what they are owed and are forced to work long hours and overtime. They are only paid a fraction of their salary in arrears as the Wongs find constant cause for deducting money from their pay. Lu Si-yan is befriended by a group of young women who are optimistic despite being in the same state as Si-yan—trapped in the factory. Eventually, Lu Si-yan becomes so ill and frail, due to overwork and the poor working conditions, that she is hospitalised. When she regains consciousness, Uncle Ba is by her bedside in the hospital and is full of remorse. He brings news that her Mother has died and he wants to take her and her brother into his home, look after them properly and earn their forgiveness. Lu Si-yan realises that her only option is to go back with him and she longs to see her brother. The Uncle promises to send her to school.

Li Mei, the best of her new factory friends, manages to get some money for Lu Si-yan and enough so she can return home also, from the Wongs. The Wongs pay up because they are terrified that their poor working conditions and exploitation of minors will be exposed.

The main themes of the book are the portrayal of rural versus town life in China, domestic servitude, sweatshops and the role of women. It is also simply and beautifully written.

References

British children's novels
2004 British novels
2004 children's books
Bloomsbury Publishing books